Cholula may refer to:

Places 
 Cholula (Mesoamerican site), a pre-Columbian archaeological site in central Mexico, significant political center in the Classic and Postclassic eras of Mesoamerican chronology
 Great Pyramid of Cholula, the pyramid-temple complex situated at the pre-Columbian site
 Cholula, Puebla, the modern-day city in Puebla state, Mexico, formal name Cholula de Rivadavia
 San Andrés Cholula, modern-day Mexican municipio (municipality), part of the conurbation of the city of Puebla
 San Pedro Cholula, modern-day Mexican municipio (municipality), part of the conurbation of the city of Puebla
 Santa Isabel Cholula, modern-day Mexican municipio (municipality), largely rural adjoining the conurbation of the city of Puebla

Products 
 Cholula Hot Sauce, commercial brand of chili-based sauce manufactured in Jalisco, Mexico